Shavano Air (IATA code SHV) was an American commuter airline based at Harriet Alexander Field that operated from 1978 to 1980.

See also 
 List of defunct airlines of the United States

References

External links

Defunct airlines of the United States
Airlines established in 1960
Airlines disestablished in 2002